Shenzhen NORCO Intelligent Technology Co., Ltd (NORCO, 华北工控), is a Chinese company with 30 branch offices, employing over 700 employees. Founded in 1991 and headquartered in Shenzhen, China, it is a manufacturer of industrial PCs and embedded computers. NORCO industrial PC products include CPU cards, embedded industrial motherboards, industrial computers, industrial workstations, Panel PCs, firewalls, storage arrays (inc. NAS), industrial power supplies, industrial chassis, passive backplanes, industrial computer accessories and IO adapters.

NORCO products are used in computer-based applications, including military, communication, material, industrial automation, energy, traffic, aviation, health care, network, AI (artificial intelligence), security, vehicle, banking and entertainment etc.

NORCO distributes its products to overseas markets in Asia, the Americas and Europe, and the domestic market, and has subsidiaries in Netherlands, Agent in Singapore, California USA, Ohio USA, in Germany. NORCO is a member of Intel Embedded Alliance (EA). In 2011 NORCO was elevated to Associate Level in Intel Embedded Alliance, and was the first PRC company to be elevated to this level.

Products
During the 2010 Shanghai Expo, NORCO embedded products were used in the fire alarm systems of the Permanent Pavilion, Russia Pavilion, Future Pavilion and Baogang Large Stage in the Expo Park; NORCO signage PCs were used in the information distribution system of China Pavilion.

During the celebrations of the 60th anniversary of the People's Republic of China, NORCO motherboards with Intel IVI system were applied to car PCs in the military review, which is the first applications of motherboards with Intel IVI system in vehicle mounted PC market.

NORCO embedded industrial PCs were used in the security examination system, intelligent parking system and video surveillance system of the 2008 Summer Olympics Stadium.

References 

Mile stones

External links 

Computer hardware companies
Manufacturing companies based in Shenzhen
Manufacturing companies established in 1991
1991 establishments in China
Chinese brands
Chinese companies established in 1991